Transport Tycoon is a city-based pixel video game designed and programmed by Chris Sawyer, and published by MicroProse on 15 November 1994 for DOS. It is a business simulation game, presented in an isometric view in 2D with graphics by Simon Foster, in which the player acts as an entrepreneur in control of a transport company, and can compete against rival companies to make as much profit as possible by transporting passengers and various goods by road, rail, sea and air.

Transport Tycoon Deluxe (also referred to as Transport Tycoon 2, Transport Tycoon II, or Transport Tycoon Plus) is an expanded and improved version of the original game, released in 1995. A version for Android and iOS was released on 3 October 2013 based on the sequel, Chris Sawyer's Locomotion. A fan-made game engine recreation OpenTTD is also available.

Gameplay
To start building a transport empire, the player must construct transport routes, consisting of stations near industries or towns, and in the case of trains or road vehicles, near physical routes. One transport route can utilize several different forms of transport, e.g. truck→ship→train. The player's company and the individual stations each have ratings that depend largely on their efficiency at moving goods from one stations to the other. A station with high ratings may attract more goods.

The game begins in 1930, and ends in 2030. The player starts out by borrowing money to finance construction of transport facilities, and is charged interest until the loan is repaid.  As the user plays the game and earns revenues, they have the choice of expanding service along existing routes, or expanding their transportation network.  The game features a progression of technology: in any particular year of the game generally only contemporary types of technology are available.  For example, railroad signals which allow more than one train to use a section of track are initially semaphores. Later, they are replaced by red and green traffic-light signals. Similarly, in the beginning there are only steam engines, but later diesel and electric engines are introduced.  In the game year 1999, monorails become available.  These require a separate track system from railroads.  If the player remains in business until 2030, the game announces that they have won, allows them to post their name on the "hall of fame" and then continues.  At this point, the year stays 2030 and never goes any higher, although the game can continue indefinitely.  Playing the entire 100-year campaign takes about 40 hours. The game allows the player to save at any time, and multiple saves of a particular game at any point are possible.

Vehicles in the game must be constructed at corresponding depots, which must be connected to the road or rail networks. Towns and cities have their own road networks, but extra roads may be needed to connect them to other towns, or to various resources.

The player earns revenue by picking up resources or passengers at a certain station, and delivering them to another station where there is a demand for them.  Demand is determined by the area which surrounds the station; for example stations close to towns will demand passengers.  The revenues will depend on the delivery time, distance, and quantity delivered.  The influence of these factors on revenue varies according to the type of goods being delivered. For example, mail will rapidly fall in value, meaning that it can only be delivered profitably over short distances, or over long distances very fast.  On the other hand, coal loses value very slowly, so it can be transported in bulk over long distances whilst remaining profitable.

At times, subsidies are offered to the first company to move a particular resource from one place to another. This encourages the player to create a larger more complex transport network, rather than focusing on previously profitable routes.

The game features a system of Local Authority. Each city has a rating for every transport company based on the impact of their transport network.  When the rating falls too low, the player will no longer be able to demolish buildings or construct new stations. The rating depends on, among others, the level of service and the deforestation caused by the company.

In the course of a game cities develop and expand according to various economic factors, and new industries (demand) or other resource sites (supply) may appear.  Some natural resources may also eventually be exhausted and industries without adequate transport service may shut down. Also, new models of vehicles are introduced and eventually come to replace older models.  At introduction such a new model will likely have improved characteristics, but may suffer from reliability issues.

Music 
The music in Transport Tycoon are original compositions by John Broomhall. It features old-style blues and jazz tunes including parts of Herbie Hancock's Cantaloupe Island.

Reception

A reviewer for Next Generation gave the DOS version four out of five stars, commenting, "The best economic sim since Civilization, Microprose's new Transport Tycoon has all the features of Sid Meier's Railroad Tycoon mixed with the look and ease of Maxis' SimCity 2000 and a host of new features ... that give the game a feel that is all its own." He further lauded the game for its graphics, "pleasant" music, sound effects, addictive play, and realistic simulation of the growth of cities and towns.

Next Generation reviewed the Transport Tycoon Scenario, rating it three stars out of five, and stated that "A solid upgrade for a great game."

Related titles
A "World Editor" expansion pack was also released for the original Transport Tycoon, but was overshadowed by the Deluxe version released shortly afterward. It featured an alternative, Martian set of graphics, which did not appear in TTD.

Transport Tycoon Deluxe
Transport Tycoon Deluxe is an expanded and improved version of the original game.

The primary difference between the games is how signals operate. The original Transport Tycoon allows only bi-directional signals, which allow trains to pass in either direction. The deluxe version introduced uni-directional signals, that only allow a train to pass in a single direction. The change in gameplay from this alteration to signals is significant, as the old bi-directional signals would allow a train to travel in both directions. This is similar in concept to having a single lane street that would allow traffic from either end. Unsurprisingly, it was possible for two trains to try to travel in opposing directions towards each other on the same run of track. While this would not result in crashes on a properly signaled route, it required either the building of extra track to allow the trains to pass each other, or the building of a great many tracks in parallel to avoid the problem in the first place.

The new uni-directional signals allowed one-way tracks to be built, which gives the player much greater control over how the railway network could be run. This allowed for efficient routes to be built, and prevented trains from trying to travel the "wrong way" down a section of track. By incorporating both uni-directional and bi-directional signals, effective switching yards, junctions, and other useful designs could be built. It also unlocked the ability to build continental-length railroad systems by incorporating one-way rails in both directions and the ability to merge other rails with the main one. This is a highly used strategy because it allows for intercontinental transport of goods which results in high return rates for the player.

The deluxe version also expanded the game to provide tropical, Arctic, and toy-town environments, as well as the classic temperate environment. The new environments came with different industries and challenges. For example, towns in the Arctic environment would not grow without regular deliveries of food, and those in the tropical environment also need access to fresh water. The main game runs over the course of a century, from 1950 to 2050.

Due to trademark issues with using names of real vehicles in the original Transport Tycoon, the default names were replaced with fictional ones in Transport Tycoon Deluxe. Players however are allowed to rename their vehicles and stations as they please, which can be useful for identifying individual services in a network.  Players are also able to rename towns, which provides for a more personalized game play.

Chris Sawyer's Locomotion 

After the success of Transport Tycoon Deluxe, Chris Sawyer turned his attention towards a sequel, but during development he changed his mind and produced RollerCoaster Tycoon, which turned out to be a runaway hit.  After RollerCoaster Tycoon 2 was done, work on the third version was left to another development team, and Sawyer returned to work on a Transport Tycoon sequel, Chris Sawyer's Locomotion. It was released in September 2004 and was described by Sawyer as the "spiritual successor to Transport Tycoon".

It received poor reviews and was deemed a commercial failure on release, but sales through the digital rereleases are unknown. Regardless, there is an active Locomotion community that continues to produce modifications.

iOS and Android version
On 15 July 2013, Sawyer's 31X Ltd and Origin8 Technologies announced that they were working on a mobile version of Transport Tycoon. Sawyer was originally focusing on funding for the game, but ended up overseeing the design and helped with the debugging. The game was released for iOS and Android on 3 October 2013. The game is single player and is primarily based on Chris Sawyer's Locomotion.

Third-party creations 

Several development teams are currently working to improve Transport Tycoon. TTDPatch provides gameplay enhancements and numerous bugfixes to TTD by patching the original binary.

OpenTTD is an open source complete recreation of Transport Tycoon Deluxe, achieved by reverse engineering the original game. It delivers many bug fixes and general enhancements to the game, like making it possible to run TTD on multiple platforms, including Mac, Linux, PSP, and Android. While both games allow new graphic sets for vehicles and terrain to be used, at present, TTDPatch still requires the original TTD graphics, sounds, binary and music files to run. While OpenTTD can still use the original TTD graphics and sounds, it does not need any of the TTD files to run as it has free graphics and sounds.

See also
 Pizza Tycoon
 Railroad Tycoon
 SimCity 4: Rush Hour
 Simutrans

References

External links
Official website

 
1994 video games
Android (operating system) games
Business simulation games
DOS games
IOS games
MicroProse games
PlayStation (console) games
Sega Saturn games
Assembly language software
Railroad business simulation video games
Transport business simulation games
Video games developed in the United Kingdom
Video games scored by John Broomhall
Video games with isometric graphics
Video games with tile-based graphics